César Vargas (born December 30, 1991) is a Mexican professional baseball pitcher for the Sultanes de Monterrey of the Mexican League. He has previously played in the Major League Baseball (MLB) for the San Diego Padres and in Nippon Professional Baseball (NPB) for the Orix Buffaloes.

Career

New York Yankees
Vargas signed with the New York Yankees as an international free agent on May 30, 2009. He made his professional debut with the DSL Yankees, recording a 3.50 ERA in 16 appearances. He spent 2010 and 2011 with the DSL Yankees, pitching to a 2.06 ERA in 2010 and a 2.39 ERA in 2011. In 2012, Vargas split the season between the rookie ball GCL Yankees and the Single-A Charleston RiverDogs, registering a 3-2 record and 3.13 ERA in 13 games. He split the next season between the High-A Tampa Yankees and Charleston, pitching to a 4-8 record and 4.10 ERA between the two clubs. Vargas split the 2014 season between Tampa and Charleston, posting a 4-2 record and 2.58 ERA with 76 strikeouts in 44 appearances. He split the 2015 season between the Double-A Trenton Thunder and the Triple-A Scranton/Wilkes-Barre RailRiders, recording a 6-0 record and 3.08 ERA between the two teams. On November 6, 2015, he elected free agency.

San Diego Padres
On November 20, 2015, Vargas signed a major league contract with the San Diego Padres. On April 23, he was called up to the major leagues to start in place of the injured Robbie Erlin, making his MLB debut. After making six starts for the Padres, Vargas went on the disabled list with a sore elbow.

Vargas was designated for assignment by the Padres on March 31, 2017. He was sent outright to the Double-A San Antonio Missions on April 5, 2017. After splitting the season between San Antonio and the Triple-A El Paso Chihuahuas, he elected free agency on November 6, 2017.

Washington Nationals
On December 18, 2017, Vargas signed a minor league deal with the Washington Nationals organization. He was assigned to the Triple-A Syracuse Chiefs for the 2018 season. Vargas split the season between Syracuse and the Double-A Harrisburg Senators, pitching to a 2-8 record and 5.14 ERA in 22 games. He elected free agency on November 2, 2018.

Sultanes de Monterrey
On April 3, 2019, Vargas signed with the Sultanes de Monterrey of the Mexican League. He pitched to a 4.34 ERA with 92 strikeouts in 114.0 innings pitched in 2019. Vargas did not play in a game in 2020 due to the cancellation of the Mexican League season because of the COVID-19 pandemic.

Ibaraki Astroplanets
On December 16, 2020, Vargas signed with the Ibaraki Astroplanets of the Japanese independent Baseball Challenge League.

Sultanes de Monterrey (second stint)
On July 5, 2021, it was announced that Vargas had left the Astroplanets and re-signed with the Sultanes de Monterrey of the Mexican League.

Orix Buffaloes
On August 21, 2021, Vargas signed with the Orix Buffaloes of the Nippon Professional Baseball (NPB) for $100,000 USD plus incentives. He re-signed for the 2022 season, posting a record of 0–1 with 6.59 ERA in 8 relief appearances. Vargas was not retained following the season and became a free agent.

Sultanes de Monterrey (third stint)
On February 10, 2023, Vargas signed with the Sultanes de Monterrey of the Mexican League.

International career
On February 26, 2019, He was selected Mexico national baseball team at 2019 exhibition games against Japan.

References

External links

 Career statistics - NPB.jp
 59 セサル・バルガス 選手名鑑2021 - Orix Buffaloes  Official site 
 

1991 births
Living people
Auburn Doubledays players
Charleston RiverDogs players
Dominican Summer League Yankees players
Mexican expatriate baseball players in the Dominican Republic
El Paso Chihuahuas players
Gulf Coast Yankees players
Harrisburg Senators players
Major League Baseball pitchers
Major League Baseball players from Mexico
Mexican expatriate baseball players in Japan
Mexican expatriate baseball players in the United States
Naranjeros de Hermosillo players
People from Puebla (city)
San Antonio Missions players
San Diego Padres players
Tampa Yankees players
Trenton Thunder players
Scranton/Wilkes-Barre RailRiders players
Sultanes de Monterrey players
Syracuse Chiefs players
Baseball players at the 2020 Summer Olympics
Baseball players from Puebla
Olympic baseball players of Mexico
Nippon Professional Baseball pitchers
Orix Buffaloes players
2023 World Baseball Classic players